Txalaparta is a free and independent Basque publishing house located in Navarra that is committed to the cultural sovereignty of the Basque Country and that it works for an open-minded and diverse world.

They also try to be a supportive platform for any literary works that aim to improve the relation between the peoples of the world, to help transform reality, to safeguard the historical memory, and to open new paths towards diversity and achieving utopia.

They publish about 40 books a year, mainly in Basque and Spanish. Their book collections include Basque and world literature, political and historical essays, works of social criticism, classic works in left-wing politics, as well as history encyclopedias.

Their most distinctive feature is that they have gained the trust of a broad base of readers who support Txalaparta's project by subscribing to their book collections.

Under the name "Editores Independientes" (Independent Publishers), they collaborate with other publishers such as ERA in Mexico, LOM in Chile or Trilce in Uruguay in order to safeguard editorial freedom and diversity against monopolistic control and uniform thought.

External links
 

Publishing companies of Spain
Book publishing companies of Spain